The Bishop of Jarrow is an episcopal title used by a suffragan bishop of the Church of England Diocese of Durham, in the Province of York, England. The title takes its name after the former Anglo Saxon monastery in the town of Jarrow in Tyne and Wear.

List of bishops

References

External links
 Crockford's Clerical Directory - Listings

 
Anglican suffragan bishops in the Diocese of Durham
Bishops of Jarrow